Egypt participated with a total of 68 athletes at the 2018 Summer Youth Olympics in Buenos Aires, Argentina. Olympians have to be aged 14–18 in order to participate. 

Egypt's run in Buenos Aires has been able to set many records. With a total amount of 12 medals, this was Egypt's most-successful Olympics.

Egypt won its first Olympics medal in a kicking sport when Egypt's Youth Futsal team took bronze in the men's event. Egypt was also able to mark their first Olympics medals in karate and boxing.

It is also noteworthy that Egypt was able to set these records despite sending a record low amount of Olympians to participate (compared to 2010 and 2014 Youth Olympics).

Egypt was ranked 22nd out of 93 nations in the final medals table.

Medalists

Competitors

Archery

Individual

Team

Athletics 

Egypt won a silver medal from the women's hammer event.

Badminton

Egypt qualified one player based on the Badminton Junior World Rankings.

Singles

Team

Basketball

Egypt qualified a girls' team based on the U18 3x3 National Federation Ranking.

Shoot-out contest

Beach volleyball

Boxing 

Boys

Cycling

Egypt qualified a girls' combined team based on its ranking in the Youth Olympic Games Junior Nation Rankings.

 Girls' combined team - 1 team of 2 athletes

Combined team

Equestrian

Egypt qualified a rider based on its ranking in the FEI World Jumping Challenge Rankings.

 Individual Jumping – 1 athlete

Fencing

Egypt qualified five athletes based on its performance at the 2018 Cadet World Championship.

 Boys' Épée – Mohamed Elsayed
 Boys' Foil – Loaay Marouf
 Boys' Sabre – Mazen Elaraby
 Girls' Épée – Mariam Amer
 Girls' Foil – Noha Hany  

Boys

Girls

Mixed team

Futsal

Egypt qualified to the futsal competition as African representative after its boys' team beat Angola in the final of the African qualifications.

Group A 
Egypt topped their group after drawing with Argentina and winning against Panama, Iraq and Slovakia.

Semifinal

Bronze medal match 

After losing the semifinal against Russia, Egypt was able to secure the bronze metal after staging a remarkable comeback against the hosts.

Gymnastics

Artistic
Egypt qualified two gymnasts based on its performance at the 2018 African Junior Championship.

 Boys' artistic individual all-around – 1 quota
 Girls' artistic individual all-around – 1 quota

Boys

Girls

Rhythmic
Egypt qualified one gymnast based on its performance at the 2018 African Junior Championship.

 Girls' rhythmic individual all-around – 1 quota

Individual

Multidiscipline

Judo 

Individual

Team

Karate

Egypt qualified one athlete based on its performance at one of the Karate Qualification Tournaments.

 Girls' −53kg – Yasmin Nasr El-Gewily

Modern pentathlon

Egypt qualified two athletes based on its performance at the 2018 Youth A World Championship.

 Boys' Individual – Ahmed El Gendy
 Girls' Individual – Salma Abdelmaksoud

Individual

Mixed team

Rowing

Qualification Legend: FA=Final A (medal); FB=Final B (non-medal); FC=Final C (non-medal); FD=Final D (non-medal); FE=Final E (non-medal); FF=Final F (non-medal); SA/B=Semifinals A/B; SC/D=Semifinals C/D; SE/F=Semifinals E/F; QF=Quarterfinals;

Sailing

Egypt qualified two boats based on its performance at the African Techno 293+ Youth Olympic Games Qualifier.

 Boys' Techno 293+ – 1 boat
 Girls' Techno 293+ – 1 boat

Shooting

Egypt qualified two sport shooters based on its performance at the 2017 African Championships.

 Boys' 10m Air Pistol – 1 quota
 Girls' 10m Air Rifle – 1 quota

Individual

Team

Swimming 

Egypt qualified 4 competitors for the games.

Boys

Girls

Table tennis

Egypt qualified two table tennis players based on its performance at the African Continental Qualifier.

 Boys' singles – Youssef Abdel-Aziz
 Girls' singles – Marwa Alhodaby

Singles

Mixed team

Taekwondo

Triathlon

Egypt qualified two athletes based on its performance at the 2018 African Youth Olympic Games Qualifier.

Individual

Relay

Weightlifting

Egypt qualified two athletes based on its performance at the 2018 African Youth Championships.

Wrestling

Egypt qualified five wrestlers based on its performance at the 2018 African Cadet Championships. 

Key:
  – Victory by Fall
  – Without any points scored by the opponent
  – With point(s) scored by the opponent
  – Without any points scored by the opponent
  – With point(s) scored by the opponent

Boys

Girls

References

2018 in Egyptian sport
Nations at the 2018 Summer Youth Olympics
Egypt at the Youth Olympics